The Hating Game is a 2021 American romantic comedy film directed by Peter Hutchings. It is based on the novel of the same name by Sally Thorne, and stars Lucy Hale and Austin Stowell in the lead roles. It was released in theaters and video on demand on December 10, 2021, by Vertical Entertainment. The film received generally positive reviews from critics.

Plot
Lucy and Josh are forced to work together after their respective publishing companies are merged. Complete opposites in every way possible, they despise each other. Their rivalry comes to a head when they go face-to-face for the same promotion. Realizing nobody wants to work under the other, they make a bet: whoever does not get the job has to quit.

However, both become increasingly attracted to each other and share a passionate kiss in the elevator before Lucy goes on a date with a co-worker, Danny. At a company paintball event a few days later, Lucy collapses due to a fever and is brought home by Josh, who has her checked by his brother Pat, a physician. Lucy overhears that Josh needs a +1 for his brother‘s wedding and offers to accompany him to get even. After they kiss again, Josh asks her to sort out things with Danny first, as he does not want to be just a fling for her. Later that evening, Josh invites Lucy to his apartment and reveals that he has a strained relationship with his father because he dropped out of med school, while his brother was always the favorite. They become closer, but Josh refuses to have sex with Lucy, angering her.

During his brother‘s wedding weekend, Lucy and Josh finally have sex. After she finds out that Pat‘s wife is Josh‘s ex-girlfriend, she is initially angry until Josh explains to her that he is over her. She witnesses Josh‘s father belittle him and stands up for him, impressing Josh. Back at home, Josh offers Lucy to start a real relationship and forget about their bet.

The next day, Lucy overhears and misinterprets a conversation between Josh and their boss, concluding that Josh has been using their romance to distract her from the promotion. Enraged, she vows to beat Josh for the job. At the day of the promotion competition, Lucy gets the job as it turns out Josh had already quit to join another company. The two kiss and become a couple.

Cast
 Lucy Hale as Lucy Hutton
 Austin Stowell as Joshua "Josh" Templeman
 Damon Daunno as Danny
 Nicholas Baroudi as Patrick "Pat" Templeman
 Corbin Bernsen as Richard Bexley
 Sakina Jaffrey as Helene
 Tania Asnes as Annabelle
 Yasha Jackson as Julie
 Brock Yurich as Mack
 Kathryn Boswell as Mindy

Production
The film was announced in May 2019, with Lucy Hale and Robbie Amell cast as the lead roles. On November 10, 2020, Austin Stowell was cast, as Amell dropped out due to a scheduling conflict. The film began filming on November 21, in New York City, and concluded on December 23, 2020.

Release
In July 2021, Vertical Entertainment acquired distribution rights to the film.

Reception
The Hating Game had a limited theatrical release on December 10, 2021. It was also available to stream on various VOD platforms. Review aggregator Rotten Tomatoes reported on late February 2022 that 71% out of 21 professional critics gave the film a positive review, with a rating average of 6.60/10.  Multiple articles praised the chemistry of the two leads.

References

External links
 
 

2021 films
2021 romantic comedy films
2020s English-language films
American romantic comedy films
Films based on Australian novels
Films set in New York City
Films shot in New York City
Vertical Entertainment films
Workplace comedy films
Works about book publishing and bookselling
Films directed by Peter Hutchings
2020s American films